John Bartholomew,   generally known as Ian Bartholomew (12 February 1890 – 9 February 1962) was a Scottish cartographer and geographer.

Life

John was the son of John George Bartholomew and Janet MacDonald. He was educated at Merchiston Castle School.

Bartholomew studied cartography in Leipzig, Paris and at the University of Edinburgh and took over the family business John Bartholomew and Son Ltd. on the death of his father John George Bartholomew. He inherited the task from his father of completing the Times Survey Atlas of the World (1921), which was expanded into the Times Mid-Century Edition (issued in five volumes between 1955 and 1960). He introduced new cartographic techniques, modern printing and expanded the company significantly.

He was awarded the Military Cross in 1915 after serving with the Gordon Highlanders and General Staff during the 1914—18 War. He was also Mentioned in Dispatches.

He served as Honorary Secretary and President of the Royal Scottish Geographical Society (1920–54) and was awarded their Scottish Geographical Medal in 1954.  In 1960 he was appointed C.B.E. and in 1961 awarded the Patron's Medal of the Royal Geographical Society of London.

He died in Edinburgh and is buried at his father's memorial against the north wall of the 20th century extension to Dean Cemetery in western Edinburgh, together with his mother Jennie, brother Hugh, and son, John Christopher Bartholomew.

Family
He married Marie Antionette Saroléa, niece of Charles Saroléa in 1920.

He entrusted the management of the company to his three sons, Peter, John and Robert.

See also
John Bartholomew and Son Ltd.

References

External links
Bartholomew: A Scottish Family Heritage - site maintained by the family.
Times World Atlases official website including a History and Heritage section detailing landmark Times atlases

Scottish cartographers
People educated at Merchiston Castle School
Alumni of the University of Edinburgh
1890 births
1962 deaths
Presidents of the Royal Scottish Geographical Society
Fellows of the Royal Geographical Society
Fellows of the Royal Scottish Geographical Society
20th-century cartographers